Alan J. Pinkney (born 1 January 1947 in Battersea, Greater London) is an English former professional footballer who played in the Football League, as a forward. He began his league career with Exeter City in 1967, making seven appearances scoring once, before signing for Crystal Palace in July 1969. Pinkney made 24 appearances for Palace over five seasons, without scoring and had a loan spell with Fulham in 1972–73 (12 appearances, no goals). He was released by Palace in 1974 and went on to play for Wimbledon and Cape Town City.

References

External links
 CPFC player stats at neilbrown.com
 Pinkney at holmesdale.net

1947 births
Living people
Footballers from Battersea
English footballers
Association football forwards
Exeter City F.C. players
Crystal Palace F.C. players
Fulham F.C. players
Wimbledon F.C. players
English Football League players
Cape Town City F.C. (NFL) players
National Football League (South Africa) players